Amadou Meïté (November 28, 1949 – February 11, 2014) was a sprinter from Côte d'Ivoire, who represented his native West African country twice at the Summer Olympics: 1972 and 1976. He is best known for winning the gold medal in the men's 100 metres at the 1978 All-Africa Games.

Meïté was the father of Ben Youssef Meïté, a double African champion in 2010 and 2012, respectively, in 100 and 200 meters.

In January 2014, Amadou Meïté was hospitalized in Abidjan for an undisclosed illness, after being transferred there from the University Hospital in Yopougon. He died in February 2014 at the age of 64.

Personal bests
100 metres – 10.32 (1980)

References

External links

1949 births
2014 deaths
Ivorian male sprinters
Athletes (track and field) at the 1972 Summer Olympics
Athletes (track and field) at the 1976 Summer Olympics
Olympic athletes of Ivory Coast
African Games gold medalists for Ivory Coast
African Games medalists in athletics (track and field)
Universiade medalists in athletics (track and field)
Athletes (track and field) at the 1978 All-Africa Games
Universiade medalists for Ivory Coast
Medalists at the 1979 Summer Universiade